Cynthia Blum Carroll (born November 13, 1956) is an American businesswoman. She was the chief executive officer of Anglo American PLC, a South African  mining company, which, among other things, is the world's largest platinum producer.

On October 24, 2006, Carroll was hired by Anglo American, and joined the board in January 2007, becoming chief executive at the beginning of March 2007. She chaired Anglo American’s Executive Committee and sat on the Safety and Sustainable Development Committee. She was one of only three female chief executives of FTSE 100 companies and the first non-South African to hold the post with Anglo American.

In 2008 she was ranked by the magazine Forbes as the fifth most powerful woman in the world. She was ranked fourth in 2009 and seventh in 2007 by the same list.

Her annual salary at Anglo American was £1,050,000 with an annual bonus of £319,000.

Anglo American announced on October 26, 2012, that Carroll would step down as chief executive.

She has been a non-executive director of BP since June 6, 2007.

Carroll previously worked for Alcan, as president and chief executive officer of the Primary Metal Group since 2002. She joined Alcan in 1989. In January 1996 she was promoted to managing director of the Aughinish Alumina division, located on Aughinish Island, Askeaton, County Limerick, Ireland.  Before joining Alcan, she worked for Amoco, which is now part of British Petroleum, for eight years as a petroleum geologist, from 1982 to 1987, working in gas and oil exploration in Colorado, Alaska, Wyoming, Utah, and Montana.

She is married with four children.

Early years and career
Carroll graduated from Skidmore College in 1978, a Bachelor of Science in Geology. She holds a Masters of Science degree in Geology from the University of Kansas (1982) and a Masters of Business Administration from Harvard University (1989).

In 2012 she was elected a fellow of the Royal Academy of Engineering.

She formerly served as a director of Sara Lee and AngloGold Ashanti Limited. She also sits on the Boards of American Aluminium Association and the International Aluminium Institute.

Cynthia Carroll has launched a number of new initiatives within the business, including an asset optimisation project; the introduction of the value based management methodology within Anglo American; and a push to improve safety performance. In 2007, she closed two platinum shafts in South Africa following a number of fatalities until the workforce received more safety training She participated in the Tripartite Safety Summit in 2008 with union, government and industry representatives to address safety concerns in the mining industry Since Cynthia Carroll took over as chief executive, Anglo American has acquired stakes in two copper projects Michiquillay in Peru and Pebble in the US;  a coal company Foxleigh in Australia;  and the iron ore project in Brazil, Minas-Rio.

Criticism and controversy
Carroll was personally attacked while at Anglo American for her responsibility in the conglomerate's labour rights record as well as her role in several environmentally controversial projects piloted by the company. Carroll was nicknamed by Grist Magazine as "Cyanide Cynthia, world's biggest Scrooge" for her role in the Pebble Mine project in Alaska.
Carroll’s strategy for Anglo American has attracted criticism. Some shareholders see her modernization plans as too radical for a company that has historically had such an important role in the South African economy, while others complain that the company has been undermanaged, and that she has not yet delivered on her proposals. And Anglo American’s recent decision to suspend its dividend has drawn criticism.

Carroll has implemented measures to address safety concerns. Anglo American responded to the allegations in the War on Want report and separately disclosed its safety performance in its annual earnings report.

The Grist magazine nickname was later discussed in a Fast Company magazine article that profiled Carroll’s initiatives surrounding the Pebble Mine project.  In 2007, Carroll issued a series of social, environmental and economic commitments on behalf of the Pebble Partnership to address concerns from the local community.

Notes

1956 births
American women chief executives
Skidmore College alumni
University of Kansas alumni
Harvard Business School alumni
Fellows of the Royal Academy of Engineering
Female Fellows of the Royal Academy of Engineering
Living people
Directors of BP
American corporate directors
British chief executives
American mining businesspeople
British mining businesspeople
21st-century women engineers
21st-century American women